Thorne may refer to:

Places

Antarctica
 Mount Thorne

Canada
 Thorne, Ontario, Canada
 Thorne, Quebec, Canada

England
 Thorne, Cornwall, England
 Thorne, Ottery St Mary, an historic estate in Devon
 Thorne, a hamlet and historic manor in the parish of Holsworthy Hamlets in Devon
Thorne Coffin, Somerset
 Thorne, South Yorkshire
Thorne Colliery

United States
 Thorne, North Dakota, an unincorporated community in the United States
 Thorne, Nevada

Other
 Thorne (surname), a list of people named Thorne
 Thorne (TV series), a 2010 crime drama starring David Morrissey
 Thorne system, a modern system of plant taxonomy

See also
 Thorn (disambiguation)